Dušan Mitošević (17 December 1949 – 1 January 2018) was a Serbian football player and manager.

Playing career
Mitošević was a reputable striker during his playing career. He played for FK Radnički Niš in the Yugoslav First League during the 1975–80 and transferred to Nîmes Olympique, France where he played in 1980–81 season. He returned to FK Radnički Niš for the next two years 1981–83 to participate in the European Competitions where the club reached the third Round and the semi Finals in the UEFA Cup. His goals during these years made him top scorer in clubs’ history. The next season, he was transferred to the Greek side Iraklis Thessaloniki, where he finished his career.

Coaching career

Iraklis Thessaloniki
Mitošević after eight years of coaching in amateur leagues and as assistant coach in FK Rad, took over Iraklis Thessaloniki, as the first significant assignment in 1994. Mitošević attacking mentality aided the club to achieve a Uefa Cup Qualification and some great records. During his two years management the club achieved a point record (62) in clubs’ pro history, the biggest GD +24 and the most wins 18 and 17 respectively in the last thirty years. The attacking oriented character was evident in the impressive numbers and scoring performances similar to the Athens big three as the team scored in 31 out of 34 home games with a remarkable average of over two goals per home game for these two periods. The team lost only one out of eight games against the city's rival (PAOK & Aris) win three and draw four times. During Mitošević second season 1995/96 Iraklis finished in the fourth place behind the Athens big three with 12 points difference from Aris and 20 points from PAOK.

Anorthosis Famagusta
In 1996 Mitošević was appointed as the manager of the Cypriot club Anorthosis Famagusta FC. He created one of the most impressive teams in the Cypriot football history. During its dominance they won four championships in a row, three super cups and a cup. The statistics are even more convincing, as they count 98 wins, 20 draws and 12 defeats in five years in official championship games. Scoring an astonishing 2.93 goals per game or 382 goals in 130 championship games. Three years in a row the team scored more than 80 goals in over 26 games. In 1997/98 and 1998/99 held the record of the highest goal scoring and goal difference in the league history. At that time Mitošević coached some of the best players in the Cypriot football history like Ioannis Okkas, Panayiotis Engomitis, Siniša Gogić, Vesko Mihajlović, Slobodan Krčmarević, Vassos Melanarkitis, and many more. He won the Coach of the Year award in Cyprus four times in a row in 1997, 1998, 1999 and 2000.

AEK Larnaca
In 2001 after five magnificent years in charge of Anorthosis Famagusta where he became one of the most successful coaches in the history of the Cypriot football, Mitošević decided to step down from his position and moved to the other big club of the city AEK Larnaca. During his time in AEK he improved every number compared to last years’ performance, and achieved the third best scoring performance, however AEK ended up again in the seventh position.

Apollon Limassol
Apollon Limassol was the next station in his Cypriot career, where under his management many young players and three current national team players (Athos Solomou, Giorgos Merkis and Constantinos Makrides) started their appearances in the first team.

Zemun
In 2003/04 Mitošević returned to his home country to coach FK Zemun at the newly established Serbia and Montenegro top division, where he managed a seventh position in the 16 teams league.

Panserraikos
In 2004 Mitosević returned to Greece this time for Panserraikos, where he stayed until 2006.

APOP Kinyras
In June 2007 Mitošević was hired by APOP Kinyras in the club's second appearance at the Cypriot top division.

Anagennisi Karditsa
Then came another spell in Greece in Anagennisi Karditsa in 2008/09 season.

Ermis Aradippou
In September 2009 the Serbian manager decided to continue his career at another newly appeared club of the top Cypriot division league, Ermis Aradippou, starting the season with 1 point in the first four games. The team played attacking football and enjoyed the most successful season in its history, achieving record points in top division, most goals scored and the Brazilian striker Joeano winning the top scorer award. He was released on August 15, three weeks before the start of the championship due to transfer policy disagreement.

Aris Limassol
The next stop for Mitošević was Aris Limassol in October 2010, where he took over the club from 12th position of the second division league and ended up winning the championship for the first time ever. The same year Aris created the biggest upset in the cup by eliminating the neighbours and the next year's champion AEL Limassol. Mitošević led the club next year to the top division when Aris beat Anorthosis for first time in their history and got the first point ever from Omonoia. He got the axe two games before the end of the season.

Ayia Napa
Second time in second division, second championship for Mitošević. The Serbian coach took charge of the club in a difficult period and he managed to lead Ayia Napa in an easy championship playing attacking football and scoring over 2.5 goals per game in average.

Managerial honours
 Cypriot First Division: 1997, 1998, 1999, 2000
 Cypriot Second Division: 2011, 2014
 Cypriot Cup: 1998
 Cypriot Super Cup: 1998, 1999, 2000

Individual honours
 Coach of the Year (Cyprus): 1997, 1998, 1999, 2000

Death
Dušan died of cancer on January 1, 2018. He was 68 years old.

References

External links
 Uefa.com
 Rsssf.com
 Rsssf.com
 Rsssf.com
 Rsssf.com
 Rsssf.com
 Rsssf.com
 Hri.org
 Rsssf.com
 Anorthosinews.blogspot.com
 Uefa.com
 
 Clubelo.com
 Soccerpunter.com
 Incyprus.philenews.com

1949 births
2018 deaths
People from Žitište
Association football forwards
Serbian footballers
Serbian football managers
Yugoslav footballers
Yugoslav football managers
FK Radnički Niš players
Yugoslav First League players
Nîmes Olympique players
Ligue 2 players
Iraklis Thessaloniki F.C. players
Pierikos F.C. managers
Super League Greece players
Serbian expatriate footballers
Expatriate footballers in France
Expatriate footballers in Greece
Serbian expatriate football managers
Anorthosis Famagusta F.C. managers
AEK Larnaca FC managers
Apollon Limassol FC managers
Aris Limassol FC managers
FK Rad managers
Expatriate football managers in Greece
Expatriate football managers in Cyprus
Iraklis Thessaloniki F.C. managers